The 2022 Tunis Ranking Series, also known as the 2022 Zouhaier Sghaier Ranking Series, was a wrestling event held in Tunis, Tunisia between 14 and 17 July 2022. It was held as the fourth of the ranking series of United World Wrestling.

Competition schedule
All times are (UTC+1)

Medal table

Team ranking

Medal overview

Men's freestyle

Men's Greco-Roman

Women's freestyle

Participating nations 
136 wrestlers from 17 countries:

  (3)
  (2)
  (7)
  (1)
  (3)
  (1)
  (1)
  (1)
  (7)
  (1)
  (27)
  (5)
  (11)
  (26) (Host)
  (19)
  (20)
  (1)

Ranking Series
Ranking Series Calendar 2022:
 1st Ranking Series: 24-27 February, Turkey, Istanbul ⇒ 2022 Yasar Dogu Tournament2022 Vehbi Emre & Hamit Kaplan Tournament
 2nd Ranking Series: 2-5 June, Kazakhstan, Almaty ⇒ 2022 Bolat Turlykhanov Cup 
 3rd Ranking Series: 22-25 June, Italy, Rome ⇒ Matteo Pellicone Ranking Series 2022
 4th Ranking Series: 14-17 July, Tunisia, Tunis ⇒ 2022 Tunis Ranking Series

References

External links 
 UWW Database
 Results book

Tunis Ranking Series
Sport in Tunis
Wrestling in Tunisia
Tunis Ranking Series
Tunis Ranking Series